Juan Alonso Idiáquez, 2nd Duke of Ciudad Real (1597 in Milan – 25 November 1653), was a Spanish noble and naval commander.

Biography  

He was the son of Don Alonso de Idiáquez de Butrón y Muxica, an important army commander, who created the Tercio of Idiaquez, and fought many battles in Flanders, Italy and France. For this, he was created Duke of Ciudad Real, Marquis of San Damián, Count of Aramayona and Biandrina. 
Juan Alonso inherited all these titles from his father.

Juan Alonso became Governor of Cádiz, and it was in this function that he fought two important naval battles.

In 1641, he won the Battle of Cape St. Vincent against a Dutch fleet. Because of this, he was chosen the next year to lead a large Spanish fleet, destined to break the Siege of Perpignan by the French. But he lost the Battle of Barcelona against a French fleet under Jean Armand de Maillé-Brézé.

He became Trece of the Order of Santiago, Governor and Captain General of Galicia and the Basque Country.
He was also Ballestero Mayor, war counsellor and Gentleman of the Bedchamber of King Philip IV of Spain.

Marriage and Children 

He married in 1613 with Ana María de Álava y Guevara, 2nd Countess of Tribiana. They had 3 children:  
 Mariana, 3rd Countess of Triviana (?–1670), married Alfonso de Silva Cerda y Guzmán, no issue.
 Isabel, 4th Countess of Triviana (?–?), married Pedro de Villela y Zorrilla, had issue
 Francisco Alfonso (1620–1687), his successor, married Francisca de Borja y Aragón, had issue.

References

Sources 
 Árbol genealógico
 Euskomedia

Spanish sailors
1597 births
1653 deaths
Dukes of Spain
Captain Generals of Galicia
Military personnel of the Franco-Spanish War (1635–1659)